The Three-Sided Mirror is a 1927 French drama film directed by Jean Epstein, starring Jeanne Helbling, Suzy Pierson and Olga Day. It tells the story of three women who remember their love affairs with the same young man. The film is based on Paul Morand's short story with the same title. It was shot during the summer of 1927. It premiered on 22 November the same year.

Cast
 Jeanne Helbling as Lucie
 Suzy Pierson as Athalia
 Olga Day as Pearl
 René Ferté as the man
 Raymond Guérin-Catelain as the suitor

Reception
The film received many compliments for its technical achievements upon the release. René Jeanne of La Rumeur wrote: "The Three-Sided Mirror is definitely the best film Mr. Epstein has given us in a long time, both because of the intelligence with which he has entered Mr. Paul Morand's thoughts, and the sensibility with which he has translated these thoughts into cinema."

References

1927 drama films
1927 films
Films based on short fiction
Films based on works by Paul Morand
Films directed by Jean Epstein
French drama films
French silent short films
French black-and-white films
Silent drama films
1920s French films
1920s French-language films